The following is a list of churches in Torridge.

Active churches 
The civil parishes of East Putford, Luffincott and Northcott have no active churches.

The district has an estimated 113 churches for 67,000 inhabitants, a ratio of one church for every 593 people.

Defunct churches

References 

Torridge
 
Churches